Fayyad Sbaihat born in Jenin, Palestine, is a Palestinian-American writer and blogger.

Life
As a student activist, Fayyad focused on corporate ethics, social responsibility in investing, and human rights. In line with a movement modeled after the anti-apartheid corporate divestment campaign directed at Apartheid South Africa in the 1970s and 1980s. Mainly through writing, public speaking, and coordinating with academic unions and organizations.

He became one of the leaders of and the national spokesperson of the Palestine Solidarity Movement, the umbrella organization that coordinates the divestment campaign across the US colleges.
Fayyad later wrote a divestment handbook titled "Fighting the New Apartheid," which was primarily based on his experience organizing with the University of Wisconsin Divestment From Israel Campaign.

The campaign was among the most successful divestment from Israel efforts to date, with Fayyad and other UW activists successfully lobbying and ultimately winning the endorsement of TAUWP, the university's largest union of instructors and professionals.

While in college, Fayyad contributed a regular column to the student newspaper The Badger Herald, covering a variety of political issues, but focusing on the Middle East.

References

See also
Economic and political boycotts of Israel
Academic boycotts of Israel
Palestinian Campaign for the Academic and Cultural Boycott of Israel
Boycott, Divestment and Sanctions

Palestinian emigrants to the United States
Living people
People from Jenin
University of Wisconsin–Madison alumni
American activists
Palestinian political journalists
Year of birth missing (living people)